Pig iron, also known as crude iron, is an intermediate product of the iron industry in the production of steel which is obtained by smelting iron ore in a blast furnace. Pig iron has a high carbon content, typically 3.8–4.7%, along with silica and other constituents of dross, which makes it brittle and not useful directly as a material except for limited applications.

The traditional shape of the molds used for pig iron ingots is a branching structure formed in sand, with many individual ingots at right angles to a central channel or "runner", resembling a litter of piglets being nursed by a sow. When the metal had cooled and hardened, the smaller ingots (the "pigs") were simply broken from the runner (the "sow"), hence the name "pig iron". As pig iron is intended for remelting, the uneven size of the ingots and the inclusion of small amounts of sand cause only insignificant problems considering the ease of casting and handling them.

History

Smelting and producing wrought iron was known in ancient Europe and the Middle East, but it was produced in bloomeries by direct reduction. Pig iron was not produced in Europe before the Middle Ages. The Chinese were making pig iron by the later Zhou dynasty (which ended in 256 BC). Furnaces such as Lapphyttan in Sweden may date back to the 12th century; and some in Mark (today part of Westphalia, Germany) to the 13th. It remains to be established whether these northern European developments derive from Chinese ones. Wagner has postulated a possible link via Persian contacts with China along the Silk Road and Viking contacts with Persia, but there is a chronological gap between the Viking period and Lapphyttan.

The phase transition of the iron into liquid in the furnace was an avoided phenomenon, as decarburizing the pig iron into steel was an extremely tedious process using medieval technology.

Uses
Traditionally, pig iron was worked into wrought iron in finery forges, later puddling furnaces, and more recently, into steel. In these processes, pig iron is melted and a strong current of air is directed over it while it is stirred or agitated. This causes the dissolved impurities (such as silicon) to be thoroughly oxidized. An intermediate product of puddling is known as refined pig iron, finers metal, or refined iron.

Pig iron can also be used to produce gray iron. This is achieved by remelting pig iron, often along with substantial quantities of steel and scrap iron, removing undesirable contaminants, adding alloys, and adjusting the carbon content. Some pig iron grades are suitable for producing ductile iron. These are high purity pig irons and depending on the grade of ductile iron being produced these pig irons may be low in the elements silicon, manganese, sulfur and phosphorus. These types of pig iron are used to dilute all the elements (except carbon) in a ductile iron charge which may be harmful to the ductile iron process.

Modern uses 
Until recently, pig iron was typically poured directly out of the bottom of the blast furnace through a trough into a ladle car for transfer to the steel mill in mostly liquid form; in this state, the pig iron was referred to as hot metal. The hot metal was then poured into a steelmaking vessel to produce steel, typically an electric arc furnace, induction furnace or basic oxygen furnace, where the excess carbon is burned off and the alloy composition controlled. Earlier processes for this included the finery forge, the puddling furnace, the Bessemer process, and the open hearth furnace.

Modern steel mills and direct-reduction iron plants transfer the molten iron to a ladle for immediate use in the steel making furnaces or cast it into pigs on a pig-casting machine for reuse or resale. Modern pig casting machines produce stick pigs, which break into smaller 4–10 kg piglets at discharge.

References 

Ancient Egyptian technology
Ancient Roman technology
Chinese inventions
Ferrous alloys
Iron
Metalworking
Smelting
Steelmaking